Sister Irene (born Catherine Rosamund Fitzgibbon; May 12, 1823 – August 14, 1896) was an American nun who founded the New York Foundling Hospital in 1869, at a time when abandoned infants were routinely sent to almshouses with the sick and insane. The first refuge was in a brownstone on E.12th St. in Manhattan, where babies could be left anonymously in a receiving crib with no questions asked. The practice was an echo of the medieval foundling wheel and an early example of modern "safe haven" practices.

As the number of infants in care grew, the Foundling Hospital came to occupy a full city block between 68th and 69th Streets. In conjunction with her work at the Foundling Hospital, in 1880, Sister Irene founded St. Ann's Maternity Hospital, at 13 East 69th Street. 

Sister Irene is among the pioneers of modern adoption, establishing a system to board out children rather than institutionalize them.

Life
Catherine Rosamund Fitzgibbon was born May 12, 1823 in Kensington, London to Irish parents. At the age of nine, Catherine emigrated to Brooklyn with her parents, where she attended St. James School, operated by the Sisters of Charity of New York. Having nearly died in the cholera epidemic of 1849, in 1850 she joined the community of the Sisters of Charity at Mount St. Vincent, New York, taking the name of Sister Mary Irene. For almost twenty years she taught in St. Peter's parish school on Barclay Street, the first Catholic school in New York State.

Sister Irene died of heart disease at the age of 73. Thousands turned out for her funeral. The New York Herald commented: "Never before in the history of New York has such a tribute been paid." The New York Times hailed her as "that great benefactor of humanity." Sister Irene is buried in the sisters' cemetery at Mt. St. Vincent.

New York Foundling

In the years following the Civil War, it was estimated, some thirty thousand homeless children wandered the streets of New York. Some were unwanted pregnancies, most the children of parents unable to provide for them. Stories of infanticide were common in the newspapers.

Sister Irene, noting a constant increase in the number of homeless and abandoned children and infants, advocated the establishment of a foundling asylum, New York Foundling. At that time no public provision was made to take care of abandoned infants. When picked up in the streets, they were sent to the municipal charity institutions to be looked after by the residents there. Almshouses provided no education and were generally an unfavorable environment for a growing child.  Often, the conditions were dirty, and orphans were joined in the shelter by those deemed criminal, diseased, or insane. At the Almshouses on Blackwell's Island in the East River, many children often died from lack of care. Many were left at the doors of the sisters' schools and houses, in the hope that they might receive from them some special consideration. Archbishop McCloskey sanctioned the project and in 1869 Sister Irene was assigned to put it into effect. After visiting the public homes for infants in several cities she organized a woman's society to collect the necessary funds for the proposed asylum. With those funds a brownstone (17 East Twelfth Street in New York City) was hired, and on October 11, 1869, Sister Irene and Sister Teresa Vincent McCrystal opened the foundling asylum with a cradle at its door. The Sisters started with five dollars to their name. They ate their first meal on the floor using old newspapers for a table cloth.

Placing a white cradle in the foyer of the Home, while leaving the front door unlocked, word was sent out that a desperate mother could enter the Home and leave her child in the cradle with no questions asked. All the Sisters asked was that when leaving, the mother ring the bell by the front door so that the Sisters would know that there was a new little one to be gathered up and brought upstairs with the other babies.
On the evening of the same day it received its first infant, and forty-four others followed before the end of the month. Within a year a larger house (3 Washington Square, North) had to be purchased. The New York World wrote: "The infants were not merely abject numbers to her, but precious individuals who deserved complete dignity and loving care."

In 1870 the city was authorized by the Legislature to give the asylum the block bounded by Third and Lexington Avenues, Sixty-eighth and Sixty-ninth Streets, for the site of a new building, and $100,000 for the building fund, provided a similar amount was raised by private donation. Of the required sum, $71,500 was realized by a fair held in 1871, and $27,500 came from three private donations. The new building was opened in October, 1873.  The name "The Foundling Asylum", under which it was incorporated in 1869, was changed by legal enactment in 1891 to "The New York Foundling Hospital". The Foundling became a teaching hospital. It was here that Doctor Joseph O'Dwyer developed a life saving method of intubation for children afflicted with diphtheria.

By 1894, a report was given by social reformer Elbridge Gerry that child murder has been practically stamped out in the City of New York from the time that the New York Foundling Hospital commenced.

Forced to evolve her own methods of dealing with foundlings and unwed mothers, Sister Mary Irene initiated a program of placing children in foster homes whenever possible, with provision for legal adoption when desired. Needy unwed mothers were given shelter and encouraged to keep and care for their own babies. To further these programs she founded three allied institutions: St. Ann's Maternity Hospital in 1880, the Hospital of St. John for Children in 1881, and Nazareth Hospital for convalescent children at Spuyten Duyvil in New York City in 1881. The practice of having, where possible, mothers of newborns nurse foundlings as well cut the mortality rate of infants in care substantially.

She also founded the Seton Hospital for tuberculosis patients in 1894, the cost of which ($350,000) she collected herself. The institution had been an innovative service-provider, and Sr. Irene is credited with using an open-air porch and windows on both sides to keep airflow on hospital units.

Upon her death in 1896, the medical board presented the Foundling Hospital with a plaque in Sister Irene's memory "to the sweet-souled woman, friend of the foundling and fallen, to the best friend any medical board ever had, this tribute is presented".

Legacy
Today the New York Foundling is one of the city's oldest and most successful child welfare agencies.

On February 12, 1997, New York City Mayor Rudolph W. Giuliani signed a local law designating the southeast corner of the intersection of Avenue of the Americas and West 17th Street, Manhattan as "Sister Mary Irene Fitzgibbon Corner".

References

1823 births
1896 deaths
Adoption history
Adoption workers
American people of Irish descent
English emigrants to the United States
English Roman Catholics
People from Brooklyn
People from Kensington
Catholics from New York (state)